Bagh (also Romanized as Bāgh) is a village in Qushkhaneh-ye Bala Rural District, Qushkhaneh District, Shirvan County, North Khorasan Province, Iran. At the 2006 census, its population was 492, in 109 families.

References 

Populated places in Shirvan County